Pseudobaeospora is a genus of fungi in the family Tricholomataceae. A 2008 estimate placed about 20 species in the widespread genus.

Species
Pseudobaeospora albidula
Pseudobaeospora aphana
Pseudobaeospora argentea
Pseudobaeospora basii
Pseudobaeospora bavariae
Pseudobaeospora calcarea
Pseudobaeospora celluloderma
Pseudobaeospora chilensis
Pseudobaeospora citrina
Pseudobaeospora cyanea
Pseudobaeospora deckeri
Pseudobaeospora defibulata
Pseudobaeospora dichroa
Pseudobaeospora ellipticospora
Pseudobaeospora euganea
Pseudobaeospora jamonii
Pseudobaeospora laguncularis
Pseudobaeospora lamingtonensis
Pseudobaeospora lavendulamellata
Pseudobaeospora mutabilis
Pseudobaeospora pallidifolia
Pseudobaeospora paulochroma
Pseudobaeospora stevensii
Pseudobaeospora subglobispora
Pseudobaeospora syringea
Pseudobaeospora wipapatiae

See also 

List of Agaricales genera
List of Tricholomataceae genera

References

External links

Tricholomataceae
Agaricales genera